Arthur Cole may refer to:

 Arthur Charles Cole (1886–1976), American historian
 Arthur Cole (priest) (died 1558), Canon of Windsor and president of Magdalen College, Oxford
 Arthur Cole, 1st Baron Ranelagh (died 1754), Irish politician
 Arthur Cole-Hamilton (1750–1810), Anglo-Irish politician born Arthur Cole
 Arthur Henry Cole (1780–1844), Anglo-Irish politician
 Arthur H. Cole (1889–1974), American economic historian